Khan Muhammad Haroon Khan Badsha also known as Badshah Khan (Urdu: بادشاه خان), an ex-provincial Minister for Agriculture Khyber-Pakhtunkhwa, Member of Provincial Assembly of Khyber Pakhtunkhwa and the headman of  Sum Elai-Mang a village in Sirran Valley, Mansehra District, Khyber Pakhtunkhwa. Sum is also a union council (an administrative subdivision) of Mansehra District in Khyber-Pakhtunkhwa province of Pakistan.

Political career

Badshah Khan a politician and (Khan) Feudal/Landlord and founder of Sum Elahi-Mang, a Khan Of Mansehra known for his generosity towards his people. Member of the provincial assembly KPK and Minister of agriculture. He was also admired for giving service in partition process for Muslims of subcontinent. Badshah Khan was known and famous in Pakhal and Mansehra district for giving shelter and food to the needy and poor people.

Badshah Khan's descendants 

 Shahzada Muhammad Asif Khan. (First district president of Pakistan Peoples Party). Son (Shahzada Fahad Haroon Khan).
 Shahzada Muhammad Gushtasip Khan. (Ex Health, Education, Development, Family planning, Home and interior minister and leader of opposition KPK) sons (Shahzada Abdullah Haroon Khan and Shahzada Akbar Haroon Khan).
 Shahzada Muhammad Azam Khan (Ex chairman UC Sum-Elahi-Mang) sons (Shahzada Sikandar-e-Azim Khan, Shahzada Shahbaz Haroon Khan and Shahzada Moosa Haroon Khan).
 Shahzada Muhammad Arif Khan. (Ex chairman UC Sum-Elahi-Mang) sons (Shahzada Muhammad Ali Haroon Khan and Shahzada Ahmad Ali Haroon Khan).
 Shahzada Muhammad Kashif Khan. (Tehsil Member UC Sum-Elahi-Mang) sons (Shahzada Muhammad Haroon Khan. The second and Shahzada Muhammad Mehmmood Haroon Khan).

See also
 List of Political Families of Pakistan
 Mohammad Haneef Khan

References 

1983 deaths
People from Mansehra District
Pakistan People's Party politicians
Members of the Provincial Assembly of Khyber Pakhtunkhwa
1909 births